Qingzi Ouyang (born 2 August 1999) is a Canadian former badminton player of Chinese origin who competes in international level events. She is a double Pan Am junior champions in the girls' singles. In the senior event, she won a bronze medal in the women's doubles as well as in the mixed doubles at the 2016 Canadian Championships, and helped Canadian women's team finished as runner-up at the Pan Am Team Championships in Mexico.

Achievements

Pan Am Junior Championships 
Girls' singles

Girls' doubles

Mixed doubles

BWF Junior Tournament 
Girls' singles

Mixed doubles

  BWF Junior International Grand Prix tournament
  BWF Junior International Challenge tournament
  BWF Junior International Series tournament
  BWF Junior Future Series tournament

References

External links 

1999 births
Living people
Chinese emigrants to Canada
Sportspeople from Vancouver
Canadian female badminton players